Bobbio may refer to

 Bobbio, a town and commune in the Province of Piacenza, Emilia Romagna, Italy
 Bobbio Pellice, a village and commune in the Province of Turin, Piedmont, Italy
 Bobbio Abbey, of the town in Emilia Romagna
 The anonymous Bobbio Scholiast who worked in the abbey during the seventh century
 The Bobbio Orosius, a seventh-century manuscript of the Chronicon of Paulus Orosius, thought to have been produced at the abbey.
 The Bobbio Jerome, a seventh-century manuscript copy of the Commentary on Isaiah attributed to St. Jerome
 The Diocese of Bobbio, erected in 1014
 Norberto Bobbio (1909–2004), an Italian philosopher, historian and journalist